Halden Station is a railway station located in downtown Halden in Østfold, Norway, located on the Østfold Line. The station is served by Vy on an hourly or semi-hourly service from Oslo Central Station, with Halden being the terminal station for all but three daily services to Gothenburg. The station was opened in 1879 as part of the Østfold Line.

The restaurant was taken over by Norsk Spisevognselskap on 1 January 1921, but then leased out to remain under the company's control. Three years later, the company again started operating the restaurant.

References

External links

Railway stations in Halden
Railway stations on the Østfold Line
Railway stations opened in 1879
1879 establishments in Norway